Zhilin is a Chinese given name. Notable people with the given name include:

Bian Zhilin (1910–2000), Chinese poet
Gao Zhilin (born 1991), Chinese footballer
Guan Zhilin (born 1962), Hong Kong actress